Christopher Wand (born 28 June 1987) is a Norwegian politician for the Conservative Party.

He served as a deputy representative to the Parliament of Norway from Buskerud during the term 2013–2017. He hails from Hole and has been a member of the municipal council and county council. He has a bachelor's degree from the BI Norwegian Business School and is the current secretary-general of the Norwegian Young Conservatives.

References

1987 births
Living people
People from Hole, Norway
BI Norwegian Business School alumni
Deputy members of the Storting
Conservative Party (Norway) politicians
Buskerud politicians